Chloropteryx paularia is a moth of the family Geometridae first described by Heinrich Benno Möschler in 1886. The wingspan is about 16 mm.

It is found in the U.S. state of Florida, as well as in the Greater Antilles. 

The larvae feed on Myrica cerifera.

References

Moths described in 1886
Hemitheini